Aspavarma or Aspa (Kharosthi: 𐨀𐨭𐨿𐨤𐨬𐨪𐨿𐨨) was an Indo-Scythian ruler of the clan of the Apraca, who ruled from around 15 to 45 CE. He ruled in the Bajaur area of modern Khyber Pakhtunkhwa, Pakistan and is considered one of the Apraca rulers. He is essentially known through his coins and a few inscription.

Inscriptions
Asparvama was a son of Apraca king Indravarma, as known from an inscription discovered in Taxila, who himself is known to be the son of Vispavarma according to Indravarma's Silver Reliquary.

Indravarma's Silver Reliquary, which is known for sure to be before the Bajaur casket, hence before 5-6 CE, and is therefore usually dated to the end of the 1st century BCE, describes Aspavarma's grandfather Vispavarma as a general, and not yet a king at that time. This tends to confirm that his grandson, Aspavarma, probably ruled quite some time later, in the middle of the 1st century CE.

Aspavarma is also referenced in Gāndhārī texts, written in Kharoṣṭhī script, dating from the period.

Coinage
The coinage shows the king on a horse, holding a whip in his right hand, in a style consistent with that of Azes II (who possibly is identical with Azes I). On the reverse, Athena makes a benediction gesture, and is flanked by a Buddhist triratna symbol.

According to Joe Cribb, from a coinage standpoint, Aspavarma was contemporary to Sasan and Mujatria, just before the rule of Kushan ruler Vima Takto.

References

Indo-Scythian kings
1st-century monarchs in Asia
History of Pakistan
1st-century Iranian people